The 2019–20 Ghana Premier League was the 64th season of top professional association football league in Ghana. The season started on 28 December 2019. 18 teams compete in the league with each club playing each other twice, home and away, with the three clubs at the bottom of the league relegated to the Division One League.

Season overview
With 18 clubs participating in the league, this marked the first time since 1980 that more than 16 clubs competed in the top division of Ghanaian football. King Faisal and Great Olympics were readmitted after separate court cases over unhappiness about their relegation from the top-flight in previous seasons. During a council meeting in October 2019 before the season began, the number of relegated teams was reduced from five to three.

The GFA announced that the league was suspended on March 15, 2020, in the middle of match-week 15, because of the global COVID-19 pandemic. On 31 May, the league was further suspended until at least 31 June.

On 30 June, the FA had a meeting and cancelled the league due to the COVID-19 pandemic. A meeting was held on 27 August 2020 to determine the start and logistics of the 2020–21 season.

Teams

League table

Season statistics

Top scorers

References

Ghana Premier League seasons

Ghana
1
Ghana Premier League, 2019-20